Yannick Noah defeated Carl-Uwe Steeb 5–7, 6–3, 6–4, to win the men's singles tennis title at the 1990 New South Wales Open.

Aaron Krickstein was the defending champion, but lost in the semifinals to Noah.

Seeds

  Ivan Lendl (quarterfinals)
  Boris Becker (quarterfinals)
  Aaron Krickstein (semifinals)
  Tim Mayotte (first round)
  Mats Wilander (semifinals)
  Andrés Gómez (first round)
  Carl-Uwe Steeb (final)
  Yannick Noah (champion)

Draw

Finals

Top half

Bottom half

References
General

Specific

1990 Holden NSW Open